American Dream is a large retail and entertainment complex in the Meadowlands Sports Complex in East Rutherford, New Jersey, United States. The first and second of four opening stages occurred on October 25, 2019, and on December 5, 2019. The remaining opening stages occurred on October 1, 2020, and thereafter.

The project was first proposed in 2003 by the Mills Corporation as the Meadowlands Xanadu, with construction beginning in 2004. After the Mills Corporation's bankruptcy in 2007, the project was taken over by Colony Capital. In May 2009, construction stalled due to the bankruptcy of Lehman Brothers. Triple Five Group announced intent to take over the mall in May 2011, and on July 31, 2013, officially gained control of the mall and the surrounding site.

After a series of ownership changes, financing issues, construction delays, and legal challenges, construction stopped again in December 2016. In late June 2017, construction had resumed, after new financing had been secured, though the project would suffer a series of "chronically delayed" opening dates. Among the attractions that opened in 2019 were the Nickelodeon Universe theme park in October and the Big Snow American Dream ski slope in December. The DreamWorks Water Park, which was scheduled to open March 19, 2020, as well as the mall's retail shops and restaurants, were delayed by the COVID-19 pandemic, which forced the mall's temporary closure on March 8. Following Governor Phil Murphy's August 26 announcement that amusements could open with restrictions on September 1, Big Snow American Dream announced it would reopen on that date, while other amusements and the mall's first major retail outlets reopened on October 1.

As of December 2021, the mall has approximately 200 tenants.

History

Meadowlands Mills (1994–2002)

The Mills Corporation first began working on plans for a mall in the New Jersey Meadowlands in 1994. The tract was owned by Empire Ltd., a company which had purchased the land in 1961 and had been planning a major development since 1987. To mitigate the heavy environmental impact, the remainder of the tract would have been converted into stormwater retention basins.

After Empire and Mills announced their proposal in 1996, the project quickly became controversial and faced opposition from a variety of environmental and conservationist groups, as well as the tract's congressman, Steve Rothman. Opponents stated that the mall would have a devastating impact on the ecological health of the area, while the Mills Corporation defended its plans by arguing that the land was already devastated by pesticide usage and invasive common reeds.

The Environmental Protection Agency and the U.S. Fish and Wildlife Service opposed the project after studying its potential environmental impact. However, the U.S. Army Corps of Engineers conducted its own study which contradicted the EPA's findings and stated that the project was not a threat to the Meadowlands area. New Jersey governor Donald DiFrancesco announced plans to protect the area in 2001, encouraging the Mills Corporation to look at other potential sites in the region. His successor, Jim McGreevey, informed Mills the following year that the state government would not provide permits for the mall, effectively ending the project as originally proposed. The Empire Tract was later permanently protected by the Meadowlands Conservation Trust, which purchased it in 2005 and renamed it the Richard P. Kane Natural Area after a noted New Jersey conservationist.

Meadowlands Xanadu (2002–2010)
In July 2002, the New Jersey Sports and Exposition Authority (NJSEA) issued a request for proposal for a project in the area that was then the parking lot of the Continental Airlines Arena. The request was inspired by the Meadowlands Mills project as well as by plans to move the New Jersey Nets out of the arena, and involved significantly less environmental damage because it would be built on already developed land. The Mills Corporation retooled its earlier proposal for Meadowlands Mills to fit the new site, and partnered with Mack-Cali Realty Corporation to design Meadowlands Xanadu, a major multi-use development which would incorporate a renovated Continental Airlines Arena. The name was taken from Mills Corporation's Madrid Xanadú, a shopping mall in Spain which opened in 2003.

NJSEA accepted several other proposals for developing the site. Westfield Group proposed Arena Place, an "urban village" and "town square" built around the arena. Hartz Mountain Industries and Forest City Realty Trust submitted plans for Expo Park at the Meadowlands, featuring an outlet mall, a convention center, an indoor racetrack, and three hotel buildings. Triple Five Group proposed MeadowFest America, which planned an adaptive reuse of the arena to create a retail and entertainment complex.

Other proposals focused on the project's location in the Meadowlands Sports Complex. International Speedway Corporation envisioned plans for Sports City America, a development centered around the proposed Garden State International Speedway, a NASCAR racetrack seating 80,000. A consortium that included Paul Newman, Carl Haas, and Mario Andretti proposed Liberty Speedway and Family Theme Park, combining a racetrack with an amusement park and connecting the two with a monorail.

In February 2003, the authority's board chose Mills Corporation and Mack-Cali's plan over the other two finalists, Westfield Group and Hartz Mountain Industries. The project was billed by Mills chairman and executive officer Laurence E. Siegel as "...a new standard for bringing lifestyle, recreation, sports and family entertainment offerings together in one location." Ground was broken on the complex on September 29, 2004, and, at the time, was expected to open two years later.

In November 2006, Colony Capital purchased the project from Mills Corporation for $500 million and pushed the projected opening to 2008.

By 2008, the colorfully gaudy exterior of the building, which is visible from the New Jersey Turnpike and New Jersey Route 3, began to draw criticism as an eyesore. Richard Codey, president of the New Jersey State Senate at the time, called the structure "yucky-looking". In 2011, then-Governor Chris Christie called it "an offense to the eyes as you drive up the turnpike" and "by far the ugliest damn building in New Jersey, and maybe America." After acquiring the project, Triple Five indicated the exterior would be repainted in a different color scheme.

In May 2009, construction on Xanadu, which was nearly 80% complete (and whose common areas were about 88% complete), came to a halt after a subsidiary of bankrupt Lehman Brothers missed payments, causing other lenders to withdraw from the project, and lost $500 million worth of construction funding. Developers stated the mall was 70% leased at the time.

In March 2009, the retailer Cabela's announced that it did not plan to open its Meadowlands location for another year, and subsequently gave "late 2010" as an estimated opening date. It would later pull out of the project by November 2010, following the collapse of Lehman Brothers and a halt to construction.

In February 2010, Stephen Ross, owner of The Related Companies in Manhattan, stated that he could finish the project by the end of 2010, possibly with a new name and look. In May 2010, the NJSEA handed the project over to the Related Companies, and the "Xanadu" name had been dropped, changing the name to "The Meadowlands".

In May 2010, the project's name was shortened from "Meadowlands Xanadu" to simply "Meadowlands."

On August 10, 2010, Colony Capital surrendered control of the development of the mall to five lenders. Four parties were noted to be interested in redeveloping the project. The Wall Street Journal on December 24, 2010, reported that Triple Five Group signed a letter of intent to invest in and finish the stalled mall. Triple Five proposed that the mall be expanded to include indoor amusement and a water park. Developers cut a deal with Deutsche Bank to provide an approximately $700 million loan to finish the project.

On February 1, 2011, after a record-breaking month of snow for the area, a 50- to 60-foot-long section of the eastern wall had buckled, and a horizontal crease was apparent on the complex's indoor ski slope. Two days later, on February 3, after workers were attempting to melt snow from the ski slope's roof, ice build-up caused the eastern wall to fail and suffer a partial collapse along an approximately  length of roof. Michael Beckerman, a spokesman for the project's lending group stated, "The Lender Group is aware of the damage to the roof caused by excessive snow and ice, but does not feel the damage affects the integrity of the structure. As such, the group has filed an insurance claim, and once the weather turns warmer, it will assess the damages and fix whatever is necessary."

American Dream (2011–2016)
On April 29, 2011, the New Jersey Sports and Exposition Authority completed a deal with Triple Five Group, the owners of two of North America's largest malls: West Edmonton Mall and the Mall of America, who had previously proposed "MeadowFest America" for the New Jersey site in 2002, before the contract was awarded to Mills Corporation. Triple Five assumed ownership of the mall and renamed it "American Dream Meadowlands", announcing a tentative opening date of early 2014, to coincide with Super Bowl XLVIII at MetLife Stadium. The deal was officially announced on May 3, 2011. Among the changes to the project would an expansion to 3 million square feet, an 8.5-acre indoor glass-domed amusement park, water parks, and an ice skating rink. In July 2012 DreamWorks Animation CEO Jeffrey Katzenberg announced that a DreamWorks Water Park would open at the mall.

In June 2012, the Giants and the Jets sought an injunction against Triple Five from resuming construction after it took over the project from the Mills Corporation, stating that the addition of amusement and water parks at the site would adversely affect traffic at MetLife stadium on days when home games were played there, specifically 16 Sundays out of the year, the day of the week that Bergen County's Blue Law prohibits shopping, though not amusement parks. The teams contended that while the mall would be closed on Sundays, the amusement park would not, which would create traffic jams on game days, when between 20,000 and 25,000 vehicles would park at the complex. Traffic studies conducted by the team estimated that 7,700 spots would be added by the project, while developers stated that it would add only 63 more cars, as local residents would be wise enough to avoid the grounds at that time, and most tourists would take the rail link to the MetLife Stadium site rather than drive. Triple Five objected to the law's restriction because it would infringe upon their business. In July 2012 Triple Five countersued for what it called an improper campaign by the teams to preserve their monopoly at the site, while dissuading potential lenders from investing. On March 12, 2014, the parties reached a tentative settlement, agreeing to drop their lawsuits. Though specific details of the agreement were not made public, the agreement allowed the long-delayed project to move forward. Construction had been ongoing since November 2013, and was expected to pick up in early 2014. Although no timetable for completion was announced, the developer originally said it would take about 24 months to complete the project once construction began. That April, Triple Five released a revised design for the mall's exterior and confirmed a tentative opening date in late 2016, though by December 2014, it was reported that this would only be a partial opening.

By May 2013, progress on the project was delayed further by financing, permitting, and a lawsuit filed by the New York Giants and New York Jets over traffic concerns. Triple Five officially took ownership of the mall on July 31, 2013, with construction set to start in late August of that year, despite the lawsuit. Construction officially began in November and the developer estimated it would take approximately 24 months to complete the project.

In June 2015, the New Jersey Local Finance Board approved a tax-sharing plan between East Rutherford and Triple Five.  In August 2015, the New Jersey Economic Development Authority reauthorized a $390 million potential tax break for the project.  These steps were intended to set the stage for a sale of up to $1 billion in government bonds to raise money to complete the project in time for its new projected completion in the second half of 2017.

In April 2016, a planned bond issue fell through. In July 2016, construction appeared to have stopped, the developers were trying to obtain $1 billion in additional financing, and the projected completion date had slipped again, to 2018. In August 2016, the New Jersey Sports and Exposition Authority announced an $800 million bond issue intended to finance further construction of the mall.

In September 2016, Triple Five Group announced that the indoor amusement park space would be occupied by Nickelodeon Universe, which would feature two world record-holding roller coasters. The TMNT Shellraiser, a Euro-Fighter, would hold the record for the steepest roller coaster drop at 121.5 degrees, and is based on a model seen at two other locations in the United States. The second coaster, a Spinning Coaster called The Shredder, consists of four-passenger cars that spin on a vertical axis as it progresses down the coaster's track, and is the world's tallest and longest free spinning coaster, at 1,600 feet. The water park is DreamWorks Water Park, which will feature attractions such as Shrek's Soggy Swamp, Kung Fu Panda Zone and Madagascar Rain Forest. The park's centerpiece will be the world's largest indoor wave pool, measuring 1.5 acres and holding 1.5 million gallons of water, and the world's second-tallest body slide, starting from a height of 142 feet and featuring a 50-foot free fall. The completed American Dream spans 3 million square feet and consists of 55 percent entertainment facilities and 45 percent retail locations. Planned entertainment venues included nightclubs, a 26-screen movie theater and 3,000-seat performing arts theater. The mall would house 450 retail shops, and more than 100 dining options, including approximately 20 full-service restaurants, a first-of-its kind kosher food hall, and a 38,000 square foot gourmet food court with 18 vendors and chef demonstrations operated by the youth-driven food and culture website Munchies. The project would also include a parking lot with 33,000 spaces, an on-site bus hub, and a train station. Triple Five projected 40 million people to visit the mall each year, half of whom would be drawn from the 62 million tourists who visit the tri-state area annually.

Construction halts and resumes again (2016–2019)
On December 22, 2016, work on the project stopped again. Financing from the 2016 bond issue was delayed until 2017. In May of that year, the developers secured $1.67 billion in construction financing from a syndicate led by JPMorgan Chase, and by the following month, work had resumed.

In June 2018, the developer indicated that most of the complex was scheduled to open in early 2019, though the water park would open at the end of 2019. In August 2018, a Triple Five executive, Tony Amrlin, specified that the project was 68% complete and would open in April 2019. That November, it was announced that September 2019 would be the water park's opening date.

In August 2018, Triple Five revealed that H&M, Uniqlo, and Zara would open stores at the mall; the three stores would be those companies' largest mall-based flagship locations. On September 25, 2018, the New Jersey Hall of Fame announced that they would be permanently moving to American Dream. On March 12, 2019, Barneys New York announced that it would open a flagship store at the mall, its only one in New Jersey. However, the firm announced in October 2019 that as part of its Chapter 11 bankruptcy reorganization, it would close most of its stores, without specifying whether the one at American Dream would be one of the few to remain open.

In 2019, Triple 5 dropped Meadowlands from the name American Dream.

On March 8, 2019, Governor Phil Murphy indicated that the mall complex would open that June, but on March 25, Triple 5 Group announced that the project would open in August. On May 20, Triple Five announced that the mall's opening date had again been moved to later in the year, and that some retailers would not open until the 2019 holiday season or early 2020. It revealed that tenants would include Tiffany & Co., Watches of Switzerland, Dolce & Gabbana, Moncler and the experimental retailer Fourpost, which operates a store at Triple Five's other mall property, The Mall of America. Triple Five also revealed more of the complex's attractions and common areas, which were planned to feature rotating art installations and attractions.

In June 2019, American Dream announced a 10-year partnership with The Coca-Cola Company and its local bottling partner Liberty Coca-Cola Beverages, which would fully-integrate the Coca-Cola brand throughout the property, and would include a branded eatery.

On July 3, 2019, officials from Triple Five announced that the opening date of the mall would be October 25. Later that month, Crain's New York Business reported that the Asian-American supermarket chain H Mart would open a  store at American Dream, which in addition to that chain's typical selection of Asian and international food items, would feature the chain's "Market Eatery" venue for top national and international food concepts and chefs, as well as New Jersey's first "Let Them Talk Bar and Stage" that would feature live music, craft cocktails, entertainment and weekly events. The store will staff a combined 70 to 100 full-time and part-time employees.

Completion, opening, and pandemic closure (2019–2020)
On September 20, 2019, Triple Five announced that the mall would open in four stages it refers to as "chapters". In October 2019, the mall's much-criticized colorful exterior was repainted white. Triple Five also announced that the ski slope would be covered in a mural painted by a Canadian artist collective, set to be completed in 2020. Much of the facade facing the Turnpike would be covered in dynamic LED displays.

On October 25, 2019, the mall opened its first chapter, an ice-skating rink and a Nickelodeon Universe indoor theme park, which contained more than 35 rides and attractions. The next chapter, the DreamWorks Water Park, was set to open on November 27, 2019. However, on November 21, 2019, the company announced that they were postponing the water park opening until March 19, 2020. The next chapter, the Big Snow American Dream ski slope, opened on December 5, 2019.

The final chapter, consisting of the mall's 350 shops and over 100 restaurants, was branded "In Grand Style", and planned for a March 2020 opening. However, on February 27, 2020, NJ.com reported that the mall's enclave of luxury stores called The Collections would open in September 2020. On February 19, 2020, Sea Life announced it would open its location at American Dream on April 23, 2020.

On March 8, the mall closed, which Triple Five Worldwide announced was a temporary measure resulting from the COVID-19 pandemic in New Jersey, thus again delaying the opening of its retail shops and the DreamWorks Water Park. That same day, it was announced that Forever 21 pulled out of American Dream, due to the company filing for bankruptcy.

In April 2020, Triple Five announced that the proportion of the retail tenants at the mall would be smaller, as the mall would consist of approximately 70% entertainment and 30% retail. Among the newly announced entertainment venues would be a trampoline park, eight more rides to Nickelodeon Universe, and interactive museums featuring elaborate props and backdrops. Plans were also in the works for several hotels that would connect to the mall via skybridges, with the area zoned for 3,500 hotel rooms. That same month, the mall partnered with Hackensack Meridian Health and Agile Urgent Care to open a drive-through testing site primarily for local police, first responders, and frontline health care workers.

On May 5, 2020, it was announced that Lord & Taylor would no longer be a tenant at American Dream, due to the company's decision to liquidate all of its stores as soon as the company reopened, in anticipation of a bankruptcy process brought about by the pandemic.

On June 24, GNC announced that it would also no longer operate a store at the mall. Barneys New York had also withdrawn from American Dream, and several other tenants were considering canceling their leases or reducing their space at the mall.

Governor Phil Murphy announced on August 26 that amusements could open with restrictions on September 1, prompting Big Snow American Dream to announce it would reopen on that date.

On September 3, 2020, Triple Five announced that on October 1, American Dream would reopen its amusement park, water park, ice rink, and mini-golf arcade, each of which would limit patrons to 25% of capacity. The mall would also unveil its first major retail tenants, 17 of which had been given certificates of occupancy and were ready to open. Among these were H&M, Primark, Zara, and It'SUGAR, with indications that others would be announced closer to the date of reopening. On September 29, 2020, it was announced that the Sea Life Aquarium and the Legoland Discovery Center would open at some point in early 2021.

On September 9, 2020, American Dream and Hackensack Meridian Health announced a ten-year partnership. The partnership includes opening a urgent care center at the complex, helping the complex reopen during the COVID-19 pandemic, and having pop-up events at American Dream about health and wellness.

Reopening (2020–present)
On October 1, 2020, American Dream officially reopened. That same day, NJ.com reported that Coca-Cola Eats, a Coca-Cola themed food court, would open later in the month, and that Munchies, a gourmet food court, would open by the end of the year. It was also announced that the luxury stores, anchored by Saks 5th Avenue, would open in March 2021, with hotels to be added in the near future.

On March 10, 2021, NJ.com reported that Sea Life Aquarium and Legoland Discovery Center would open at the mall on May 4. However, on April 21, 2021, American Dream announced that they were postponing the opening date of the Sea Life Aquarium and Legoland Discovery Center, which eventually opened officially on May 29.

On July 8, 2021, American Dream announced that The Avenue, the luxury wing of the complex consisting of over 20 retailers and upscale eateries and named for its anchor store, Saks 5th Avenue, would open on September 17, 2021, as would the mall's Ferris Wheel. That August, the Oreo Café opened on the third floor of the mall's candy and novelty store IT'SUGAR. The eatery, which sells Oreo-themed desserts and beverages, was the first of its kind.

On September 14, 2021, Hasbro announced that the company would open a branded game room at American Dream called The Game Room powered by Hasbro. The venue, which is the first of its kind, would include an arcade platform with video games and interactive amusements like Skee Golf. It was scheduled to open near the SeaLife Aquarium in 2022.

In the early hours of September 25, 2021, the ski slope caught fire, but no injuries were reported. In the weeks after the fire, the mall's management announced that repairs would take months to be completed.

In December 2021, NJ.com reported that Toys R Us would open a 20,000 square foot, two-story global flagship store at American Dream. In light of the pandemic-related closings of its stores at Garden State Plaza in Paramus, New Jersey and The Galleria mall in Houston, Texas, this would be the company's only brick and mortar store until that company's July 2022 comeback, and would open in the middle of the month, in time for holiday shopping.

In May 2022, Bloomberg News reported that the mall reported nearly $60 million in losses in 2021, a result of the COVID-19 pandemic, a September 2021 fire at the Big SNOW ski slope that closed that venue until early 2022, and delays in openings for some stores and attractions. The mall's expenses totaled $232.4 million, but its revenue reached only $173 million. In June 2022, the mall made a late payment to its bondholders of $13.9 million, but remained behind on its payments, including interest on the bond payment that its owners missed on June 1, which put them in default. This prompted East Rutherford Mayor Jeffrey Lahullier to state that same month, "The mall's definitely in trouble, there's no doubt in my mind."

On September 4, 2022, YouTuber Jimmy Donaldson (popularly known as Mr. Beast) opened the first brick and mortar location of MrBeast Burger, which until then had been a delivery-only service utilizing virtual restaurants. The opening attracted thousands of fans to the mall.

On October 17, 2022, LMNTS, a luxury streetwear and lifestyle retailer, opened its first East Coast store at American Dream.

On February 19, 2023, a decorative helicopter fell into a swimming pool at Dreamworks Water Park, injuring four people.

Tenants

American Dream consists of 70 percent entertainment facilities and 30 percent retail locations.

General
 Six distinctive grand atria flooded with natural light. One includes an extensive garden with bird-filled aviaries and rabbit fields; another will be an entertainment hub.
 Albero dei Sogni/Secret Garden – a tree-like sculpture consisting of more than 75,000 LED lights and 25,000 leaves that play music during intervals several times a day
 A 60-foot fashion fountain that can be converted into a catwalk in seconds
 Interactive museums featuring extravagant props and backdrops
 Instagram moments – areas designed specifically for social media photography
 Museum-scale interiors displaying artwork by local and international artists

Shopping
 450 retail shops
 Six anchor retail tenants with more than  each
 12 major retailers ( each)
 339 smaller shops (up to )
 A 35,000 square foot H Mart Asian-American supermarket
 A 20,000 square foot, two-story Toys R Us flagship store

Dining
 Over 100 eateries
 21 full-service restaurants
 45 specialty food retailers
 A , 18-vendor, Munchies themed food hall, which includes a kosher food court

Entertainment

 One of the six aforementioned atria is a  space that will serve as an entertainment hub for live events.
 Indoor NHL-sized ice rink.
 Nickelodeon Universe – an indoor theme park.
 DreamWorks Water Park – a year-round indoor water park
 A 2,400–3,000 seat performing arts and concert venue
 Big Snow American Dream – an indoor ski slope
 Two miniature 18-hole golf courses
 CMX premium dine-in cinema
 KidZania family entertainment center
 Lucky Strike Lanes bowling alley
 Legoland Discovery Center
 Sea Life Aquarium
 Climbzone indoor rock climbing facility
 Mirror Maze attraction
 The Game Room powered by Hasbro
 Skip Barber Racing Go-Kart Academy
 Jump, a virtual reality cliff jumping attraction
 Trampoline park

Dream Wheel
Announced in February 2008, PepsiCo agreed to pay $100 million for a ten-year sponsorship of Pepsi Globe, a London Eye-style ferris wheel built facing the New Jersey Turnpike that would measure , and feature 26 glass enclosed, climate controlled gondolas that would take 20 people on 25-minute rides. Its planned opening was in 2009. It would be the largest Ferris wheel in America, but it drew much criticism from local residents and politicians who viewed it as an eyesore, and who voiced concerns about both safety and its obstruction of views of Manhattan's skyline across the Hudson River, which they feared would hurt property values and damage the image of the local communities. PepsiCo eventually withdrew their sponsorship of the ferris wheel, which would no longer be branded with that company's name or logo. By 2015, the ferris wheel was still being planned, but had been rechristened the Observation Wheel, and would be only  feet in diameter, though it would retain the same number of gondolas. The wheel was again renamed The Dream Wheel by the time it opened on April 13, 2022.

Ice rink
Since 2021, American Dream's ice rink has been home to a hockey initiation program sponsored by the NHL's New Jersey Devils. In September 2022, American Dream was named as the main home ice for the Metropolitan Riveters of the Premier Hockey Federation, a professional women's hockey league.

Transportation and parking

Public transport
Public transportation to American Dream Meadowlands' on-site bus hub and train station is provided by NJ Transit. Direct local and express bus service to American Dream includes the following NJ Transit Bus lines:
 85: Hoboken/Union City – American Dream
 355 Express: Port Authority Bus Terminal – American Dream
 356: Secaucus Junction – American Dream
 703: Paterson/Passaic – American Dream
 772: Hackensack – American Dream

For travel by rail, the Meadowlands station is the western terminus for the Meadowlands Rail Line, located at the Meadowlands Sports Complex next to American Dream. However, that line is not being operated daily for American Dream, but solely during events at the stadium. NJ Transit stated that daily rail service could be added "once the rail system is resilient enough that doing so won't adversely affect NJ Transit commuters."

Multi-modal service is provided by NY Waterway, which provides a package service consisting of ferry service from Manhattan to Weehawken Port Imperial in Weehawken, followed by a bus for the remaining 6.5 miles to the mall. Passengers can also take the bus without a ferry connection.

Private transport
Motorists traveling to the location are accommodated with a 33,000-space parking lot. American Dream initially announced plans to charge for daily parking, but changed this, charging patrons only when events were held at MetLife Stadium. By August 2021, this was amended again to make parking free for the first hour, after which motorists would be charged $3.00 USD. As of 2022, parking is free for the first 30 minutes and costs $5.00 for any additional time. 

In April 2019 it was reported American Dream planned to run a fleet of several helicopters to offer luxury transportation for wealthy international tourists and residents from a helipad to be located on the roof of the mall's Saks Fifth Avenue store, one of three located on the property by the time it opened that October. That month, NorthJersey.com reported the mall had purchased three helicopters in May, plus four automoblies—two Rolls-Royces and two Bentleys—to transport customers from Manhattan and the Hamptons. American Dream would also employ a Rolls-Royce golf cart to move VIP guests throughout the property. The amenity made American Dream one of the region's first retail centers to offer such an accommodation to shoppers wishing to avoid traffic.

Criticism

Opposition to the idea of building a permanent shopping center within the Meadowlands Sports Complex centered on traffic and environmental concerns. The project is being built on state-owned land, as the NJSEA is a state agency, and $81.3 million was spent on transportation improvements such as new off and on ramps and a train station at the Sports Complex. Some have also called the mall a "colossal real estate nightmare", and "perhaps the worst retail failure ever".

The project was also criticized by environmentalists who issued a complaint on July 10, 2012, that draft permits approved by the Army Corps of Engineers would allow five more acres of wetlands to be destroyed for the project, which had already filled in more than seven. Jeff Tittel, director of the New Jersey chapter of the Sierra Club, stated, "This project will increase traffic and flooding while taking business away from existing stores. This project is the Super Bowl of Sprawl and the American Dream is a commuter's nightmare."

In May 2006, the U.S. Securities and Exchange Commission (SEC) announced it was formally investigating the Mills Corporation, the original developer of the property, after it announced that it was restating four years of earnings due to executive misconduct and accounting errors. Later in the year, an analyst at Bank of America Securities pushed Mills Corporation to drop the project, citing the signs of cost overruns.

In 2007 the Federal Aviation Administration expressed concerns about the height of the Ferris wheel, which at the time was planned to be , which the FAA feared would affect local air traffic to and from Teterboro Airport.

In June 2012, the New York Giants and the New York Jets filed a lawsuit against Triple Five, seeking to halt construction. The lawsuit claimed that the addition of amusement and water parks at the site would adversely affect traffic at MetLife stadium on days when home games were played there, specifically 16 Sundays out of the year, the day of the week that Bergen County's Blue Law prohibits shopping, though not amusement parks. The teams contended that while the mall would be closed on Sundays, the amusement park would not, which would create traffic jams on game days when up to 25,000 vehicles would park at the complex. Traffic studies conducted by the team estimated that 7,700 spots would be added by the project; the developers countered that the amusement parks would add only 63 more cars, claiming that local residents would be wise enough to avoid visiting on a game day, and most tourists would take the rail link rather than drive. In July 2012 Triple Five countersued for what it called an improper campaign by the teams to preserve their monopoly at the site while dissuading potential lenders from investing. On March 12, 2014, the parties reached a tentative settlement, agreeing to drop their lawsuits, which allowed the project to move forward.

In February 2015, U.S. federal prosecutors accused Joe Ferriero, former chairman of the Bergen County Democratic Organization and New Jersey political power broker, of bribery, fraud, and racketeering charges. The charges included an allegation that Mills Corporation paid Ferriero $1.7 million over the course of several years as a bribe or extortion to maintain Ferriero's political support for their development bid on the Xanadu project against rivals Hartz Mountain Industries. James Dausch, a former Mills Corporation employee testified that the $1.7 million was paid for Ferriero's consulting, not as a bribe. Dausch's testimony detailed much of the development bid process, including paid lobbyists positioning Mills with Governor Jim McGreevey, then Governor Richard Codey, as well as with Senator Robert Menendez. In April 2015, Ferriero was found guilty on five counts, but not on the Mills Corporation racketeering charges.

The State of New Jersey, through the New Jersey Sports and Exhibition Authority, issued $1.15 billion in tax-free bonds to support the project. These unrated bonds yielded 6.625% when first issued. They were part of a suite of tax concessions negotiated with the state and the City of Hackensack.

See also
 Patriot Place
 Titletown District
 List of the world's largest shopping malls
 List of largest shopping malls in the United States
 American Dream Miami

References

External links

 
 Lyne, Jack (2006). $1.3B, 4.8MSF Xanadu Project Will Transform 'Swamps of Jersey'. Site Selection.
 Douglass, David (October 5, 2004). "Meadowlands Xanadu Unveils First Wave of Major Tenants, Consumer Brands and Entertainment Experiences". Business Wire
 Ma, Myles (June 19, 2012). "American Dream Meadowlands shopping center may not be open for 2014 Super Bowl in New Jersey". NJ.com.

Meadowlands Sports Complex
East Rutherford, New Jersey
Shopping malls in New Jersey
Buildings and structures under construction in the United States
Buildings and structures in Bergen County, New Jersey
Tourist attractions in Bergen County, New Jersey
Shopping malls established in 2019
Shopping malls in the New York metropolitan area
2019 establishments in New Jersey